Paul Feiler (30 April 1918 – 8 July 2013) was a German-born artist who was a prominent member of the St Ives School of art: he has pictures hanging in major art galleries across the world.

Early life

Paul Feiler was born in 1918 in Frankfurt-am-Main, Germany into a cultivated family of lawyers, doctors and liberal politicians; his father was a professor of dentistry. He was educated in Zwolle in the Netherlands and then at Canford School in Dorset, England.

His parents in 1936 moved to London: his father established himself as a dentist in Harley Street. Paul studied at the Slade School of Fine Art in London 1936-1939 with artists such as Patrick Heron, Bryan Wynter and Kenneth Armitage. As an enemy alien in 1939, although thoroughly anglicised, he was interned on the Isle of Man and then in Canada. On his return to England in 1941, he was an arts teacher at Eastbourne College, which had been evacuated to Radley College in Oxford.

After World War II, he taught art at the West of England College of Art in Bristol: he became the head of painting there in 1960.  In 1975 he moved to the disused chapel in Kerris near Newlyn in Cornwall where he would live until his death.

Artistic career

Feiler’s first solo exhibition was a sell-out at the Redfern Gallery in London in 1953. He had four more exhibitions there in the 1950s.
 
The Obelisk Gallery in Washington DC in 1954 had the first of several solo exhibitions across America.

Feiler has paintings in many art galleries worldwide including the Tate St Ives, Victoria and Albert Museum, National Gallery of Art in Washington DC, Bibliothèque nationale de France in Paris, Bristol Art Gallery, Art Gallery of Ontario in Toronto, and Kettles Yard in Cambridge.

The Tate St Ives had two large solo exhibitions of his work in 1995 and 2005. He worked in his Kerris studio every day until his death in 2013 aged 95.

Paul Feiler married the artist June Miles in 1945: they had two daughters and a son – the marriage was later dissolved. In 1970 Feiler married the artist Catharine Armitage: they had twin sons.

Solo exhibitions

1953-57 Redfern Gallery, London

1954, 1958 Obelisk Gallery, Washington DC

1959 Redfern Gallery, London

1961 Arnolfini Gallery, Bristol

1962, 1965 Grosvenor Gallery, London

1965 Victoria Art Gallery, Bath

1966 Balliol College JCR, Oxford

1966 Clare College JCR, Cambridge

1969 Richard Demarco Gallery, Edinburgh

1969 Sheviock Gallery, Plymouth

1972 Archer Gallery, London

1975 Goodman Gallery, Johannesburg

1975 St Clements Hall, Mousehole, Cornwall

1977 Wills Lane Gallery, St Ives, Cornwall

1979 Meredith College, NC, USA

1979 Duke University, NC, USA

1981-82 Crawford Centre for the Arts, University of St Andrews and toured to: Alpirsbacher Galerie, Alpirsbach EKG Kunst, Stuttgart

1981-82 John Hansard Gallery, University of Southampton

1981-82 Warwick Arts Trust, London: introduction by John Steer

1982 Fayetteville Museum of Art, North Carolina, USA: introduced by Phyllis A McLeod

1993 Redfern Gallery, London: introduction by John Steer

1994 Redfern Gallery, London

1995/96 Retrospective Exhibition, Tate Gallery, St Ives

1996 Redfern Gallery, London

1998 The Rotunda, Hong Kong

1999 Redfern Gallery, London

2002 "Connections", Redfern Gallery, London and Le Cadre, Hong Kong

2002 Redfern Gallery, London

2003 “Works on Paper”, Redfern Gallery, London

2005 Janicon, Redfern Gallery, London

2005 “The Near and The Far”, Tate Gallery, St Ives

2005 Redfern Gallery, London

2005 Tate St. Ives

2007 Redfern Gallery, London

2010 Paul Feiler  “Elusive Space”, Redfern Gallery, London

2011 Paul Feiler  “A Retrospective”, Lemon Street Gallery, Truro, Cornwall

2013 Paul Feiler “Past and Present”, Redfern Gallery, London

2018 Paul Feiler “Elusive Space: a centenary retrospective”, Redfern Gallery, London

Group exhibitions

1949 Young Contemporaries, Arts Council of Great Britain (Western Region exhibition at Bristol City Museum and Art Gallery

1950 Bristol City Art Gallery, (with Bryan Wynter, R W Treffgarne, Adrian Ryan, Patrick Heron)

1952 Bryanston School, Dorset (with Bryan Wynter, William Scott, Peter Lanyon, Patrick Heron)

1952 The Mirror and the Square, AIA New Burlington Galleries

1953 "The Unknown Political Prisoner", ICA West Country Landscapes ACGB (Western Region touring exhibition, also shown in Germany)

1953 Coronation Exhibition, The Redfern Gallery, London

1953 "Figures in their Setting", Tate Gallery

1953 British Contemporary Paintings, Arts Council Gallery, London

1954 Nine English Painters, Dublin

1954 The Octagon, Bath with Bryan Wynter, Peter Potworowski and Peter Lanyon

1954 "The Seasons", Tate Gallery

1956 Statements - a review of British Abstract art in 1956, ICA, London, curated by Lawrence Alloway

1956 Aspects of contemporary English painting, Parsons Gallery, London

1957 British Abstract Painting, Paris, Milan, Montreal, Melbourne, Sydney

1957 Metavisual, tachiste and abstract painting in England today, Redfern Gallery, London

1957 Dimensions: British abstract art 1948-1957, O'Hana Gallery, London, curated by Lawrence Alloway

1958 British Abstract Painting, Redfern Gallery, London exhibition toured to: Auckland, Liège, Johannesburg, Cape Town

1959 Architect's Choice ICA, London

1959 50 Years of British Painting, CAS exhibition organised by Denis Matthews and shown through the 'Friends of China' in Beijing and Shanghai

1960-61 Contemporary British Landscapes, ACGB touring exhibition

1961 John Moore's Gallery, Liverpool

1961 British Painting in the '60's, Tate Gallery

1961 Arnolfini, Bristol

1964 Peter Lanyon, Hilton, Feiler, Davie, Arnolfini Gallery, Bristol

1966 British Painting 1950-57 ACGB touring exhibition

1972 Two (works each) by seven (artists), Archer Gallery, London

1977 "Cornwall 1945-55", New Art Centre, London

1980 Art in the making, Brewhouse Art Centre, Bristol

1985 St Ives 1939-64: Twenty-five years of painting, sculpture and pottery, Tate Gallery, London, curated by David Brown, introduction by David Lewis

1989 Post-war British abstract art, Austin/Desmond Fine Art, London (introduction by Margaret Garlake)

1999 "Orbis - Towards and Beyond" - A historical exhibition of works done before, during, and after the 1969 moon landing, Redfern Gallery, London

2000 ART 2000 - Redfern Gallery stand devoted entirely to his work.

See also

 List of German painters

References

External links
 

1918 births
2013 deaths
20th-century German painters
20th-century German male artists
German male painters
21st-century German painters
Alumni of the Slade School of Fine Art
German emigrants to the United Kingdom
St Ives artists
Artists from Frankfurt
20th-century English painters
English male painters
21st-century English painters
21st-century German male artists
20th-century English male artists
21st-century English male artists